"Nothing Lasts Forever" is a song by Australian punk rock band The Living End. It was first released in Australia on 19 September 2006, as the fourth single from the band's album State of Emergency.

The song charted at #39 of the Australian ARIA charts. It was the song played by Australian TV channel SBS for the video for stage 15 of the 2006 Tour de France.

Track listing
All tracks written by Chris Cheney.
 "Nothing Lasts Forever" – 4:54
 "What's on Your Radio" (Live) – 3:17
 "Long Live the Weekend" (Live) – 2:55

References

2006 singles
The Living End songs
2006 songs
Songs written by Chris Cheney
Song recordings produced by Nick Launay
EMI Records singles